5th Avenue station is an elevated Manila Light Rail Transit (LRT) station situated on Line 1. The station is located on Rizal Avenue Extension at the boundaries of Grace Park East and Grace Park West in Caloocan. The station is located above the avenue's intersection with 5th Avenue (C-3), where the station got its name.

5th Avenue station serves as the fourth station for Line 1 trains headed to Baclaran, the seventeenth station for trains headed to Roosevelt, and is one of the two Line 1 stations serving Caloocan, the other being Monumento station.

Transportation links
The station is served by bus routes 2, 17, and 22 along 5th Avenue, as well as jeepneys plying the Rizal Avenue route. Tricycles may also be boarded at nearby streets.

See also
List of rail transit stations in Metro Manila
Manila Light Rail Transit System

References 

Manila Light Rail Transit System stations
Railway stations opened in 1985
Buildings and structures in Caloocan
1985 establishments in the Philippines